The 1921 Oglethorpe Stormy Petrels football team was an American football team that represented Oglethorpe University as a member of the Southern Intercollegiate Athletic Association (SIAA) during the 1921 college football season. In their second year under head coach Jogger Elcock, the team compiled an overall record of 5–4 with a mark of 2–4 in conference play, placing tied for 16th in the SIAA.

Schedule

References

Oglethorpe
Oglethorpe Stormy Petrels football seasons
Oglethorpe Stormy Petrels football